This is a list of places with numeric names.

0 

 :nl:Nulde, (zero), Netherlands, old name for a hamlet in Putten
 Nullarbor, locality in South Australia (Latin: no trees)
 Nullarbor Plain, desert region in Western and South Australia (Latin: no trees)

1/2 (half) 

 :de:Halbstadt, (German "half town") are/were named  towns in Russia and elsewhere
 Half Hollow Hills, New York, US
 Half Moon Bay, California, US
 Half Rock, Missouri, US
 Half Tree Hollow, Saint Helena
 Halfway, Missouri, US

1
 1 Decembrie, Romania, a commune south of Bucharest ("1st of December")
 Aintree, England ("one tree")
 Een, The Netherlands ("one")
 Einhaus, Germany ("Onehouse")
 Einsiedeln, Switzerland
 Einsiedelei (German "one (person) living (place)", eremitage), a (forgotten) place on the foot of a hill in the West of Graz, Austria
 Province No. 1, Nepal

2
 Aberdaucleddau ("mouth of the two rivers Cleddau"), Welsh name for Milford Haven, Wales
 Deux-Sèvres, France (refers to two rivers in the department called Sèvre)
 Dois Vizinhos ("2 neighbours"), Paraná, Brazil
 Duas Bocas Biological Reserve ("2 mouths"), Brazil
 Duas Barras ("2 bars"), Rio de Janeiro, Brazil
 Duas Estradas ("2 roads"), Paraíba, Brazil
 Duas Igrejas ("2 churches"), Paredes, Portugal
 Dos Pilas ("2 wells"), Guatemala
 Dos Vientos and Dos Vientos Open Space ("2 winds"), California
 Dos Hermanas ("two sisters"), Andalusia, Spain
 Dvigrad ("two towns"), Croatia
 El Segundo ("the second"), California, United States
 Río Segundo in Argentina and Costa Rica, "second river"
 Llanddeusant, Anglesey, Wales (= church of two saints)
 Llanddeusant, Carmarthenshire, Wales (= church of two saints)
 Second Garrotte, California
 Second Mesa, Arizona
 Song District, Phrae, Thailand - The reason of naming (before the year 1527) is remain unclear, but the name is same as the Thai word that means "two".
 Song Khwae District ("two waterways"), Nan, Thailand
 Song Phi Nong District ("two siblings"), Suphan Buri, Thailand
 Twee Riviere ("two rivers"), a town in South Africa
 Twee Rivieren ("two rivers"), a suburb in South Africa
 Tweebuffelsmeteenskootmorsdoodgeskietfontein, ("two buffaloes with one shot") South Africa
 , Dutch ("two houses"), Netherlands
  ("two rivers"), Namibia
 Tweedetol ("second toll"), near Dordrecht, Netherlands
 Twin Cities, Minneapolis and Saint Paul, Minnesota, USA
 Twin Cities, further ones
 Twin City, a developing concept for Vienna, Austria and Bratislava, Slovakia
 Twin City, Georgia, in Emanuel County, Georgia, USA
 Twin City, nickname for Winston-Salem, North Carolina, USA
 Two Bridges, Manhattan, a neighborhood in New York City, United States
 Two Buttes, Colorado
 Two Guns, Arizona
 Two Harbors, Minnesota, United States
 Two Harbors, California, United States
 Two Rock, California
 Two Rocks, Western Australia
 Twyford, Berkshire, England (= two fords)
 Twyford, Buckinghamshire, England (= two fords)
 Twyford, Hampshire, England (= two fords)
 Twyford, Leicestershire, England (= two fords)
 Zweibrücken ("two bridges"), Germany
 Zweisimmen, Switzerland, at the confluence of the Gross and Klein Simme rivers, zwei means two in German

3 
 Dreiflüssestadt, a colloquial name for Passau, Germany (= three (merging) rivers town)
 Dreikirchen, Germany (= three churches)
 , The Netherlands (= three)
 Driebergen, The Netherlands (= three mountains)
 Driehuis, The Netherlands (= three houses)
 Driemond, The Netherlands (= three (river) mouths)
 Llantrisant, Wales (= church of three saints)
 Río Tercero in Argentina, "third river"
 Salatiga ("three wrongs"), Indonesia
 Sam Chai District, Kalasin, Thailand (= "three wins" or "three victories")
 Sam Khok District, Pathum Thani, Thailand (= three mounds)
 Sam Ngam District, Phichit, Thailand (= three prongs)
 Sam Ngao District, Tak, Thailand (= three shadows)
 Sam Phran District, Nakhon Pathom, Thailand (= three hunters)
 Third Hill Mountain, West Virginia
 Three Bridges, England
 Three Churches, West Virginia
 Three Points, California
 Three Rivers, California
 Three Rivers, Michigan
 Three Rivers, New Mexico
 Three Rivers, Texas
 Three Rivers, Prince Edward Island
 Three Rivers District, England
 Three Rivers South, Oregon
 Three Rocks, California
 Three Sisters (Australia)
 Three Sisters (Northern Cape)
 Three Sisters (Oregon)
 Three Springs, Western Australia
 Three Mile Island, New Hampshire
 Three Mile Island, Pennsylvania
 Three Way, Tennessee
 Tre Kronor castle ("three crowns castle"), Sweden
 Trekroner ("three crowns"), Denmark
 Trekroner Fort ("three crowns fort"), Denmark
 Tres Cantos ("3 corners"), Madrid, Spain
 Tres Cerros ("3 hills"), Argentina
 Três Coroas ("3 crowns"), Rio Grande do Sul, Brazil
 Tres Cruces ("3 crosses"), Uruguay
 Tres de Febrero Partido ("3rd of February"), Argentina
 Tres Islas, Guatemala
 Tres Islas, Uruguay
 Tres Pinos, California
 Tres Valles ("3 valleys"), Mexico
 Tri cities, see Twin Cities
 Tricity, Poland of Gdynia, Sopot and Gdańsk
 Triangle cities, see Twin Cities
 Triglav ("3 peaks"), Slovenia, a national symbol of the country
 Triple cities, see Twin Cities
 Tripoli, Lebanon (= three towns)
 Tripoli, Libya (= three towns)
 Trishal ("3 Shal"= Shorea robusta), Bangladesh
 Trois-Pistoles, Canada (= three pistoles (coins))
 Trois-Ponts (German: Dreibrücken), Belgium (= three bridges)
 Trois-Rivières, Canada (= three rivers)
 Trois-Rivières, Guadeloupe (= three rivers)

4 

 Big Four, West Virginia
 Cuatro Caminos ("4 roads"), one of the first metro stations in Madrid, Spain
 Cuatro Cañadas ("4 paths"), Bolivia
 Cuatro Ciénegas ("4 marshes"), Mexico
 Cuatro Torres ("4 towers"), Madrid business district
 Cuatro Vientos ("4 winds"), Madrid neighbourhood and military-civil airport and museum
 Four Acres, California
 Four Corners, a region of the United States
 Four Crosses, Staffordshire, England
 Four Lane Ends, a district within the ward of Richmond, South Yorkshire
 Four Lane Ends, a hamlet near Tiverton, Cheshire
 Four Lane Ends Interchange, a Metro station in Newcastle upon Tyne, England
 Four Square Mile, Colorado
 Fourth Crossing, California
 Kiryat Arba, israel ("קריית ארבע") meaning four towns
 Quad Cities, a region of the United States
 Quad cities, see further Twin Cities
 Río Cuarto in Argentina and Costa Rica, "fourth river"
 Sichuan, China (= 4 rivers)
 Tetrapolis (Attica)
 Doric Tetrapolis
 Vierhouten, The Netherlands (= 4 pieces of wood)
 Vierlingsbeek, The Netherlands
 Vierwaldstättersee, (founding place of:) Switzerland (= lake, where 4 forests meet)

5 

 Cinco Ranch, Texas
 Cinque Ports, England
 Cinque Terre ("five lands"), Italy, after the five villages along the coastline
 Five Corners, Oregon
 Five Corners, Washington
 Five Fingers, New Brunswick
 Five Forks, Calhoun County, West Virginia
 Five Forks, Ritchie County, West Virginia
 Five Forks, Upshur County, West Virginia
 Five Islands, Nova Scotia
 Five Mile Terrace, California
 Five Towns, Long Island, New York; a group of communities in the Town of Hempstead
 Five Ways, Birmingham, in England
 Five Ways railway station
 Five Ways, Victoria, Australia
 Fiveways, Brighton, a district of Brighton, England
 Fünfhaus ("five houses"), part of the district Rudolfsheim-Fünfhaus (15.) and one of 89 municipalities within Vienna, Austria
 Llanpumsaint, Wales (= church of five saints)
 Ma'ale HaHamisha, ISRAEL (= ascent of the five)
 Panchagarh ("5 forts"), Bangladesh
 Panchbibi ("5 wives"), Bangladesh
 Piatykhatky, Dnipropetrovsk Oblast ("five houses"), Ukraine
 Pentapolis, five cities in Greek
 Pompeii, Italy, after the five districts of the city
 Pumsaint ("five saints"), Wales
 Punjab, India and Punjab, Pakistan ("The Land of Five Waters"), an Indian state and a Pakistani province
 Pyatigorsk, Stavropol Krai, Russia ("five mountains")
 Río Quinto in Argentina, "fifth river"
 Vijfhuizen, The Netherlands ("five houses")
 Vyf Rand ("five rand"), Namibia

6 
 Doric Hexapolis in Greek
 Blue Jay 6, West Virginia, an unincorporated community in Raleigh County 
 Sechshaus (Amtsbezirk) ("six houses"), former district of Lower Austria, Austria
 Sechshaus ("six houses"), part of the district Rudolfsheim-Fünfhaus (15.) of Vienna, Austria
 Sechshaus ("six houses"), part of the community Brand-Nagelberg, Lower Austria, Austria
 Sexdrega, Sweden – originally meaning six fishing places.
 Six, West Virginia
 Sixes, Georgia
 Sixes, Oregon – The community was named after the Sixes river. Accounts vary as to how the river got its name. One local postmaster said Sixes was named for a Native American chief.
 Six Hills in Stevenage, England
 Six Mile Bottom, village near Cambridge, England
 Six Mile Creek, four places in the US, one in Australia, mainly rivers
 Six Shooter Canyon, Arizona
 6th of October, city in Egypt.
 6th of October Governorate, former governorate of Egypt

7 

 Beer Sheva ("seven wells"), Israel
 Heptapolis in Greek
 Hét ("7"), Borsod-Abaúj-Zemplén, Hungary
 Prampir Makara ("January 7th"), Phnom Penh, Cambodia
 Satkhira ("7 Kheers"), Bangladesh
 Sete Cidades ("7 cities"), Azores (Portugal) and Piauí (Brazil)
 Sete Fontes ("7 springs"), Braga, Portugal
 Sete Lagoas ("7 lagoons"), Minas Gerais, Brazil
 Seven Fields, Pennsylvania
 Seven Kings, London, England
 Seven Mile, Arizona
 Seven Mile, Ohio
 Seven Oaks, California
 Seven Oaks, Oregon
 Seven Oaks, South Carolina
 Seven Sisters, London, England
 Seven Springs, Pennsylvania
 Seven Troughs, Nevada
 Sevenoaks, Kent, England
 Seventh Mountain, Oregon
 Siebenbürgen (7 castles), German for Transylvania, historical region in Romania
 Siebenhirten ("seven shepherds"), Austria is one of 89 municipalities within Vienna and also the name of an underground railway station.
 Satara , Maharashtra, India. District place.
 Zevenaar
 Zevenhoven ("seven gardens"), the Netherlands
 Zevenhuizen ("seven houses"), several places in the Netherlands

8 

 Acht (Eifel), Germany
 Acht, near Eindhoven, Netherlands
 Achtmaal, The Netherlands (= eight times)
 Austagram ("containing 8 villages"), Bangladesh
 Eight, West Virginia
 Eight Mile Plains, Brisbane
 Eightmile, Oregon
 Kiryat Shmona ("town of the eight"), Israel
 Ocho Ríos ("8 rivers"), Jamaica

9 

 :nl:Negenhuizen ("nine houses"), Netherlands
 Neunkirchen, Austria ("9 churches")
 Nine Elms
 Nueve de Julio ("July 9th"), several towns in Argentina
 Nueve de Julio Department ("July 9th"), several departments in Argentina
 Nueve de Julio District ("July 9th"), Peru
 Nueve de Julio Partido ("July 9th"), Argentina
 Kao Liao District (lit. "9 turns" or "9 curves"), Nakhon Sawan, Thailand
 Kelok 9 ("9 turns"), a bridge and road segment in Lima Puluh Kota Regency, Indonesia
 Kowloon, a region of Hong Kong meaning "9 Dragons" in Chinese
 Pont Neuf, crossing the river Seine in Paris, France (= brigde (number) 9)
 Stowe Nine Churches in Northamptonshire, United Kingdom

10
 10th of Ramadan, Egypt
 Decapolis in Greek
 Ten Sleep, Wyoming
 Tiendeveen ("tenth peat"), Netherlands
 Tiengeboden ("Ten Commandments"), The Netherlands 
 Tiengemeten ("Ten Acres"), The Netherlands 
 Diez de Octubre ("October 10th"), Cuba
 Washakie Ten, Wyoming

11
 Lot 11 and Area, Prince Edward Island
 Once de Octubre ("October 11th"), Argentina
 Once de Septiembre ("September 11th"), Argentina
 Ruyton-XI-Towns, United Kingdom

12
 Twelve, Tennessee, (formerly known as Badger-on-a-Stick, Tennessee), is a small unincorporated community on the outskirts of Bumpus Mills. The name was officially changed in 2009 to reflect the population at the time.
 , Germany, earlier a slightly different written name, later folk-etymologically changed, Dutzend / See means a dozen / lake in German
 , Großer and Kleiner, Dutzend / Teich means a dozen / pond in German, two ponds, a big and a small one, in Germany
 , one of 87 statistical districts (Statischer Bezirk) of Nürnberg, Germany
 Zwölfaxing, Austria. Zwölf means twelve in German, hence it is a city with a number in its name.
 Doce de Octubre ("October 12th"), Argentina
 Baramulla ("12 roots"), India
 Xishuangbanna ("twelve districts", literally "twelve township rice-fields"), China

13
 Trece Mártires ("13 martyrs"), Philippines

14
 Chauddagram ("14 villages"), Bangladesh
 Vierzehn is an incorporated village of Rainbach im Mühlkreis, Austria
 Catorce, San Luis Potosí, Mexico
 Real de Catorce ("real [a kind of currency of Spanish America] of [value] 14", or from "14 killed soldiers"), Mexico
 Catorce de Noviembre ("November 14th"), Panama

16  
 Solapur , Maharashtra, India. District Place in Maharashtra.

17 

 Seventeen Mile Point, California
 Seventeen Mile Rocks, Queensland

18
 18-Hazari, 18-Hazari Tehsil, Jhang District, Punjab, Pakistan
 Dieciocho Airport, Costa Rica
 Dieciocho de Julio ("July 18th"), Uruguay
 Dieciocho de Mayo ("May 18th"), Uruguay

20
 Kurigram (lit. "containing 20 villages"), Bangladesh
 Twenty, Lincolnshire
 Veinte de Junio ("June 20th"), BBAA, Argentina
 Veinte Reales, Philippines ("20 reales [a coin]", the price for the lands or for the use of a magical spring)

23
 Mila 23 ("Mile 23"), Romania, a village in the Danube Delta

24
 North 24 Parganas district
 South 24 Parganas
 Veinticuatro de Mayo and Veinticuatro de Mayo Canton ("May 24th"), Ecuador

25
 Veinticinco de Agosto ("August 25th"), Uruguay
 Veinticinco de Diciembre ("December 25th"), Paraguay
 Veinticinco de Mayo ("May 25th") (several places in Argentina and Uruguay)

26
 Twentysix, Kentucky - Twentysix is an unincorporated community in Morgan County, Kentucky. The story is that the community's first postmaster, Martha Rowland, submitted 25 possible community names, and then jotted down "26," which was the year she submitted the list, 1926.

27
 Veintisiete de Abril ("April 27th"), Costa Rica

28
 Veintiocho de Noviembre ("November 28th"), Argentina

29
 Twentynine Palms, California

30 

 Thirtymile, Oregon

33 
 Treinta y Tres and Treinta y Tres Department, Uruguay ("from the 33 original fighters for the independence")

35 

 Netiv HaLamed-Heh, ("path of the 35") Kibbutz in Israel

36 

 Chhattisgarh ("thirty-six forts"), a state in India

40
 Cuarenta Casas ("40 houses") archaeological site, Mexico
 Chalisgaon ("40 cities") historic town, India

50
 Lima Puluh Kota ("50 towns"), Indonesia

56
 Fifty-Six, Arkansas – When founding the community in 1918, locals submitted the name "Newcomb" for the settlement. This request was rejected, and the federal government internally named the community for its school district number (56). It has frequently been noted on lists of unusual place names.

60
 Hatvan, Hungary – Hatvan is the Hungarian word for 60. A possible etymology is from the Pecheneg-Turkic chatwan/chatman, meaning "part of a nation".

66
 Sixty Six, South Carolina

76
 Seventy Six, Kentucky
 Seventy-Six, Missouri

84
 Eighty Four, Pennsylvania – Eighty Four was originally named Smithville. Due to postal confusion with another town of the same name, its name was changed to "Eighty Four" on July 28, 1884.

88
 Eighty Eight, Kentucky – As reported in an article in The New York Times, the town was named in 1860 by Dabnie Nunnally, the community's first postmaster. He had little faith in the legibility of his handwriting, and thought that using numbers would solve the problem. He then reached into his pocket and came up with 88 cents. Another explanation is that the hamlet is 8.8 miles from Glasgow.

96
 Ninety Six, South Carolina – There is much confusion about the mysterious name Ninety-Six, and the true origin may never be known. Pitcher Bill Voiselle of the Boston Braves was from Ninety Six and wore uniform number 96.

100
 Hundred, West Virginia – It was named for Henry Church and his wife, the first settlers, who lived to be 109 and 106. Hundred is the only place in the United States with this name.
 100 Mile House, British Columbia – Named for being the location of a roadhouse at the 100 mile mark up the Old Cariboo Road during the Cariboo Gold Rush.
 Chafford Hundred, England – A turn of the 21st century built settlement north-west of Grays, and south-east of South Ockendon in the Borough of Thurrock in the ceremonial county of Essex.
 List of hundreds of England and Wales – Hundreds were an ancient subdivision of counties in England and Wales, listed here; some have individual Wikipedia articles, and some still exist, as does, in name only, the office of Crown Steward and Bailiff for the [three] Chiltern Hundreds, a famous resource for UK parliamentary bureaucracy.

101
 Roi Et Province, Thailand - The name is literally 101 in Thai language.
 Wonowon, British Columbia ("one-oh-one") – located at Mile 101 on Highway 97, the Alaska Highway.

300
 Sam Roi Yot District, Prachuap Khiri Khan, Thailand. - lit. "three hundred peaks". Its ancient name is Sam Roi Rot (lit. "three hundred (persons are) survives").

400
 Fjärdhundra, Sweden

1,000
 Thousand Islands – an archipelago in the St. Lawrence River along the boundary between New York and Ontario
Kepulauan Seribu – Local word meaning Thousand Island. An archipelago under the administrative division of Jakarta
 Thousand Oaks, California
 Thousand Palms, California
 Thousandsticks, Kentucky
 Vila Nova de Milfontes, Portugal

1,400
  ("fourteen hundred"), Bangladesh

1,770
 Seventeen Seventy, Queensland – Although the town is referred to locally as "1770", the official name of the town is "Seventeen Seventy". It commemorates the arrival of Captain James Cook on the Endeavour in that year.

2,500
 Araihazar, ("two-and-a-half thousand") Bangladesh.

3,000
 Bueng Sam Phan District, Phetchabun, Thailand -  lit. "lake 3,000". The number 3,000 is about many crocodiles in the lake of Bueng Sam Phan.
 Khlong Chorakhe Sam Phan (Chorakhe Sam Phan canal) in Kanchanaburi and Suphan Buri, Thailand - lit. "crocodile 3,000", means three thousand crocodiles.
 Sam Phan Bok ("3,000 shallow lakes") in Thailand

4,000
 Si Phan Don ("Four Thousand Islands"), Laos

10,000
 Na Muen District ("ten thousand (rice) paddy fields"), Nan, Thailand
 Ten Thousand Islands, Florida, United States

20,000
 Ventimiglia, Italy (coincidental, as it comes from Album Intimilium)

40,010
 Shimanto, Kōchi, Japan

100,000
 Thong Saen Khan District ("hundred thousand bowls of gold", lit. "hundred thousand water dippers of gold"), Uttaradit, Thailand

Names with trailing numbers 

The following location names end with trailing roman numbers.

 Kapur IX, a district in Lima Puluh Kota, Indonesia
 Krems I, a part of the village Leezen, Germany
 Krems II, a part of a different region, but again in Schleswig-Holstein, Germany
 Peter I Island, Antarctica
 Petersdorf I, Styria, Austria
 Petersdorf II, until end of 2014, Styria, Austria
 Takern I, part of the community , Styria, Austria
 Takern II, part of the same community, Styria, Austria
 Wakendorf I, a municipality in the district of Segeberg, in Schleswig-Holstein, Germany. 
 Wakendorf II, a different municipality in the district of Segeberg, in Schleswig-Holstein, Germany

References

Numeric names
Places